Pánuco Municipality may refer to:
 Pánuco Municipality, Veracruz
 Pánuco Municipality, Zacatecas

Municipality name disambiguation pages